Herman Kunnen (28 March 1925 – 27 August 2001) was a Belgian sprinter. He competed in the men's 400 metres at the 1948 Summer Olympics.

References

External links
 

1925 births
2001 deaths
Athletes (track and field) at the 1948 Summer Olympics
Belgian male sprinters
Olympic athletes of Belgium
Place of birth missing